is a 1982 arcade platform game developed and released by Nintendo based on the comic strip of the same name created by E. C. Segar and licensed from King Features Syndicate. Some sources claim that Ikegami Tsushinki did programming work on the game. The game was licensed by Atari, Inc. for exclusive release in the United Kingdom and Ireland in an Atari-designed cabinet. Nintendo ported the game to the Famicom, while Parker Brothers published versions for other home systems. Popeye no Eigo Asobi, an educational spin-off similar to the later Donkey Kong Jr. Math, was released for the Famicom on November 22, 1983.

Gameplay

The object of the game is for Popeye the Sailor to collect a certain number of items dropped by Olive Oyl, depending on the level — 24 hearts, 16 musical notes, or 24 letters in the word HELP — while avoiding the Sea Hag, Brutus and other dangers. The player can make Popeye walk back and forth and up and down stairs and ladders with a 4-way joystick. There is a punch button, but unlike similar games of the period, no jump button. Conversely, Brutus can jump down a level, or merely stoop and reach down into the level below, and he can also jump up to hit Popeye if he is directly above.

Despite the feature of a punch button, Popeye cannot attack Brutus directly. Instead, the button is used for the following:
Punching destroys items that could hurt Popeye such as bottles, vultures and skulls. 
Each level has a can of spinach; punching these cans will give Popeye invincibility and he can knock out Brutus just by running into him, although after a few seconds Brutus will swim back out and be ready for action again.
In Round 1 (the dock scene) of each three-round cycle, as well as the first round and third rounds of each four-round cycle, is a punching bag, which Popeye can use to knock loose a nearby barrel from its position near the top of the playing field. If the barrel falls onto Brutus’ head, the player earns bonus points (based on where Bluto was attacked) and renders Brutus harmless for several seconds.

Other licensed Popeye characters in the game are Olive Oyl, Swee'Pea, and Wimpy, though they are mostly decorative and do not add heavily to the gameplay. Wimpy appears in Round 2 (the street scene) on one end of the seesaw in the lower left corner of the field, to act as a counterweight. Swee'Pea floats high above, with bonus points to be earned if Popeye can spring off the see-saw and touch him.

Popeye loses a life if he is hit by Brutus or any thrown/flying object, or if he fails to collect a dropped item within a certain amount of time after it reaches the bottom of the screen and also gets scolded by Olive Oyl for this.

Development 
Popeye was designed by Genyo Takeda and Shigeru Miyamoto. The Popeye characters were originally slated for the game that became Donkey Kong, starring Mario, Donkey Kong, and Pauline but Nintendo was unable to license the characters at the time.

Ports
Parker Brothers ported the game to the Atari 8-bit family, Atari 2600, Atari 5200, Intellivision, Commodore 64, TI-99/4A, and ColecoVision, and one of the few games ported to the Odyssey². A board game based on the video game was released by Parker Brothers in 1983. There was also a Popeye tabletop video game with a color LCD, but it was not based on the arcade game.

On July 15, 1983, Popeye was one of the three launch games for the Family Computer, along with Donkey Kong and Donkey Kong Jr.

Reception
In the United States, Popeye topped the Play Meter arcade chart for street locations in April 1983.

Electronic Games wrote in 1983 that the arcade version of Popeye at first appeared to be "yet another variation of a theme that's become all too familiar since Donkey Kong". "But there are some nuances", it added, "not the least of which are the graphics and sound effects, that tend to allow the game the benefit of the doubt in execution". The magazine concluded that "Popeye does offer some interesting play that is more than complemented by the cosmetics." The Arcade Express newsletter scored it 7 out of 10 in January 1983, calling it "the closest thing to a videogame cartoon seen yet in an arcade," but also that "game play, unfortunately, doesn't come up to visual standards." Michael Pugliese writing for The Coin Slot described Popeye as "a visually stimulating and exciting game that will go well in any location," and noted that "it contains all the challenges and character appeal to make it a solid earner for a long time." Computer and Video Games magazine gave the arcade game a generally favorable review.

Antic wrote that the Atari 8-bit version of Popeye "is a thoroughly entertaining challenge for gamers of all ages". Mechanics differing from other climbing games, the magazine said, gave it above-average replay value. Computer Games magazine gave the ColecoVision and home computer conversions an A rating, calling Popeye a "terrific cartoony climbing game, much better than Donkey Kong."

Legacy
The Famicom saw an educational spin-off on November 22, 1983: Popeye no Eigo Asobi, an English teaching game akin to the later Donkey Kong Jr. Math.

In 2008, Namco Networks released an enhanced remake for mobile phones. The game plays largely the same, and features an enhanced mode in addition to the arcade original, which includes a bonus stage and an extra level paying homage to the short A Dream Walking where Popeye must save a sleepwalking Olive, as well as some trivia segments. In the game it is possible to earn tokens, which can be used to buy some of the old comic strips.

Remake 

On November 4, 2021, independent developer Sabec LTD released a reimagining of the arcade game, simply titled Popeye, with 3D graphics for the Nintendo Switch. With three-dimensional gameplay that features Popeye wandering in an overworld avoiding Bluto (called "Brutus" in this game) to collect hearts from Olive Oyl and spinach to power himself up, it was met with bad Metacritic scores and YouTube reviews.

Reviews for the game are negative, and bring up poorly rendered graphics and environments, limited music (in which a rendition of the Popeye theme plays indefinitely during gameplay, and is not looped properly), minimal use of sound effects, poor controls, animations and optimization of the game itself (causing lag spikes during stages), repetitive stages and gameplay, inconsistent collision detection with enemies and environments, reuse of official Popeye artwork throughout the game at the title screen, between stages and the end credits, and glitches in general.

The game has been labeled an asset flip, as it also uses Unity store bought assets, for levels from the Polygon Pirate Pack, featuring pirate ships at a beach more realistic than the game's cartoony visuals, which originally showcases a timeframe in which steam and diesel engines exist, and using other people's models (such as Popeye fanwork) without any credit. The character animations also are taken from Mixamo.

High score
Ben Falls holds the world record score of 3,023,060 earned on December 20, 2011, according to Twin Galaxies International Scoreboard.

Notes

References

External links

Popeye at NinDB
 
 

1982 video games
Arcade video games
Atari 2600 games
Atari 5200 games
Atari 8-bit family games
Cancelled ZX Spectrum games
ColecoVision games
Commodore 64 games
Game & Watch games
Intellivision games
Mobile games
Multiplayer and single-player video games
Nintendo games
Nintendo arcade games
Nintendo Entertainment System games
Nintendo Research & Development 1 games
Platform games
TI-99/4A games
Video games based on Popeye
Video games developed in Japan
Video games designed by Shigeru Miyamoto
Magnavox Odyssey 2 games